Antonino Caponnetto (5 September 1920 – 6 December 2002) was an Italian Antimafia magistrate.

Biography 

Caponnetto was born in Caltanissetta in 1920. His career began in 1954 in Florence, but he became famous only in 1983, after Rocco Chinnici's assassination, when he took over his job in Palermo. 
Under his lead, the Antimafia pool of magistrates came to organise the first grand trial against the Mafia. The pool included magistrates such as Chinnici, Paolo Borsellino, Giovanni Falcone, Giuseppe Di Lello and Leonardo Guarnotta.

He retired in 1990, and engaged himself since then in political activities supporting legality and social justice. In 1999 he organised the first "Legality meeting", an annual event that gathers journalists, magistrates and civil associations. The meetings are still held today.

He died from natural causes in 2002 in Florence.

Orders 

 2nd Class / Knight: Cavaliere Ordine al Merito della Repubblica Italiana: 2 June 1983

See also
Sicilian Center of Documentation

References

External links
Fondazione Antonino Caponnetto 

1920 births
2002 deaths
People from Caltanissetta
20th-century Italian judges
Antimafia